The 2015–16 Santa Clara Broncos men's basketball team represented Santa Clara University during the 2015–16 NCAA Division I men's basketball season. This was head coach Kerry Keating's ninth season at Santa Clara. The Broncos played their home games at the Leavey Center and were members of the West Coast Conference. They finished the season 11–20, 7–11 in WCC play to finish in sixth place. They lost in the quarterfinals of the WCC tournament to BYU.

On March 7, 2016, head coach Kerry Keating was fired by Santa Clara. He finished at Santa Clara with a nine-year record of 139–159 and was the first coach to win both a College Basketball Invitational and a CollegeInsider.com Tournament titles. On March 29, the school hired Herb Sendek.

Previous season
The Broncos finished the 2014–15 season 14–18, 7–11 in WCC play to finish in a three-way tie for sixth place. They advanced to the quarterfinals of the WCC tournament where they lost to BYU.

Departures

Incoming Transfers

Recruiting

Roster

Schedule and results

|-
!colspan=9 style="background:#AA003D; color:#F0E8C4;"| Exhibition

|-
!colspan=9 style="background:#AA003D; color:#F0E8C4;"| Non-conference regular season

|-
!colspan=9 style="background:#AA003D; color:#F0E8C4;"| WCC regular season

|-
!colspan=9 style="background:#AA003D; color:#F0E8C4;"| WCC tournament

References

Santa Clara Broncos men's basketball seasons
Santa Clara